Boultham is a suburb of the Lincolnshire city and county town of Lincoln, England. The population of the City of Lincoln ward at the 2011 census was 7,465.

The ecclesiastical parish of Boultham covers most of Lincoln west of the River Witham near Lincoln High Street. The northern boundary is defined by Brayford Pool and the Fossdyke as far as Carholme Golf Course. The parish includes the University of Lincoln, Hartsholme and Swanpool. Tritton Road (B1003) runs through the centre of Boultham.

As at 2011, the Boultham ward on Lincoln City Council is represented by three Labour Party councillors; the ward on Lincolnshire County Council by one Labour councillor.

A new library opened in June 2006.

Nature reserve
Boultham Mere, created in 1989, is a nature reserve situated near a railway line and looked after by the Lincolnshire Wildlife Trust. Its colony of Variable Damselfly is of national importance.

References

External links
 
 "Boultham Mere", Lincolnshire Wildlife Trust Nature Reserves
 "Boultham Mere - seeing Bittern in Lincolnshire", Lincsbirdclub.co.uk. Retrieved 4 August 2013
 "Boultham Mere", Boulthamere.blogspot.com
 "Lincolnshire and UK Dragonflies and Damselflies", Forktail.co.uk
 

Areas of Lincoln, England
Former civil parishes in Lincolnshire